Angelina, Santa Catarina is a municipality in the state of Santa Catarina in the South region of Brazil.

See also
List of municipalities in Santa Catarina

References

Municipalities in Santa Catarina (state)